Carlos Alberto Seguín (1907–1995) was a Peruvian physician.

People from Arequipa
1907 births
1995 deaths
Peruvian physicians
National University of San Marcos alumni